Lowlands is an album by Irish songwriter, and folk singer Susan McKeown, released in 2000.

The tracks on this album present an array of styles, including African, Appalachian, Middle Eastern and Irish. "Lord Baker" is often heard as fragment of a ballad, but here McKeown has included the full story, making this the longest track on the album. The Scots songs "The Dark Haired Girl" was translated into Irish by McKeown.

Track listing 
All songs Traditional unless otherwise noted.
 "The Dark Haired Girl" (An Nighean Dudh) (sung in Irish)
 "John Coughlin"
 "The Hare's Lament"
 "Slan agus Beannact/ Goodbye and Farewell" (sung in Irish)
 "The Snows They Melt the Soonest"
 "Nansi Og Ni Obarlain/ Young Nancy Oberlin" (sung in Irish)
 "Lord Baker" [Lord Bateman. Child Ballad 53]
 "Dark Horse on the Wind" (Liam Weldon)
 "The Lowlands of Holland"
 "Bonny Greenwoodside" [Child Ballad 20]
 "To Fair London Town"
 "The Moorlough Shore"

Personnel 
 Aidan Brennan – guitar
 Mamadou Diabaté – kora
 Johnny Cunningham – fiddle
 Joanie Madden – whistle, low whistle
 Matt Darriau – kaval, Irish flute, clarinet, bass clarinet
 Ole Mathisen – clarinet
 Jamshied Sharifi – synthesiser
 Skuli Sverisson – electric bass
 Benjamin Wittman – percussion)
 Garry Leonard – guitar
 Greg Anderson – bouzouki
 Paddy League – bodhran
 Todd Schietroma – cahones, shakers, caxixis, handclaps
 Des More – guitar
 Eilis Egan – box
 Samir Chatterjee – tablas
 Oliver Straus – handclaps
 Wang Guowei – erhu
 Eaman O'Leary – banjo
 John Anthony – caxisis
 The group Lunasa consisting of:
 Donough Hennessy – guitar
 Kevin Crawford – whistles
 Sean Smyth – fiddle
 Trevor Hutchinson – acoustic bass

The following appear on the track "To Fair London Town":
 Michelle Kinney (cello)
 Cillian Valelly (uilleann pipes)

Susan McKeown albums
2000 albums